Broxton is a civil parish in Cheshire West and Chester, England.  It contains 24 buildings that are recorded in the National Heritage List for England as designated listed buildings,  The parish includes the Bolesworth Estate, and the settlement of Brown Knowl, and is otherwise rural.  The major structure, and the only one listed at Grade II* is the castellated country house, Bolesworth Castle.  All the others are listed at Grade II.  These include nine structures associated with Bolesworth Caste, the church in Brown Knowl with a tomb in its churchyard, and an 18th-century milestone.  Otherwise the listed buildings are related to houses or farms.

Key

Buildings

References
Citations

Sources

Listed buildings in Cheshire West and Chester
Lists of listed buildings in Cheshire